Elena Vladimirovna Kotulskaya (formerly Kofanova; ; born August 8, 1988) is a Russian runner who specializes in the 800 metres.

International competitions

See also
List of European Athletics Indoor Championships medalists (women)

References

 

1988 births
Living people
Russian female middle-distance runners
Universiade medalists in athletics (track and field)
Universiade silver medalists for Russia
Medalists at the 2011 Summer Universiade
World Athletics Championships athletes for Russia
Russian Athletics Championships winners
World Athletics indoor record holders (relay)
20th-century Russian women
21st-century Russian women